The Nissan Maxima is a full-size car manufactured and marketed by Nissan and offered as Nissan's flagship sedan primarily in North America, the Middle East, and China — and currently in its eighth generation. Having debuted for model year 1982 as the Datsun Maxima, it replaced the earlier Datsun 810. The name Maxima dates to  model year 1981 when Datsun marketed the upscale 810 as the 810 Maxima in North America. Like the 810, early versions of the Maxima had their origins in the Datsun/Nissan Bluebird. It is renamed to Nissan Maxima when the Datsun brand was phased out for model year 1985. 

The Maxima was marketed as an upscale alternative to the Altima and prior to 1993, the Stanza, distinguished by features such as a premium interior and V6 engine. Most Maximas were built in Oppama, Japan, until North American assembly began in Smyrna, Tennessee for model year 2004.

In some markets beyond North America, the Maxima name has also been used on variations of the Nissan Cefiro and Teana (see below). The Maxima nameplate has been used intermittently in the Japanese domestic market, initially as a luxury version of the Bluebird. 



First generation (G910; 1981) 

The first car to wear the Maxima name, the second generation Datsun 810, was introduced in 1980 for model year 1981. It was essentially a Japanese-market Datsun Bluebird (910) with the wheelbase extended  to accommodate the inline-six engine. This model replaced the Datsun 810 (first generation). The second generation Datsun 810 was not marketed in Japan, only in North America as the lower trim Datsun 810 Deluxe and upper trim 810 Maxima. Both were available with either sedan or wagon bodywork. In 1981 for the 1982 model year, all 810s were rebranded as Datsun Maxima. In 1983 for model year 1984, the last year of the first generation Maxima, North American Datsuns began carrying the "Nissan" badge as well. Only 1984 model year Nissans have rear "Nissan" and "Datsun" badges, although earlier models had a "Datsun" badge with a small "by Nissan" designation below.

For the first model year, the 810 Deluxe came with a five-speed manual transmission, while the upper trim 810 Maxima only came with a three-speed automatic. The Maxima's introduction to North America followed the successful introduction of the Datsun 240Z, and used the same engine and transmission while offering luxury content four doors. The sedans have independent rear suspension while the wagon has a leaf sprung live rear axle. The wagon also received rear drums rather than disc brakes.

It was also available with the 2.8-liter LD28 OHC inline-six diesel engine (available in the US from mid-1981 through 1983) with either a five-speed manual or a four-speed automatic transmission with overdrive.

Some of the power steering pumps were sourced from General Motors' Saginaw Gear division, while others were sourced from Atsugi. This was the second Nissan to use US-sourced parts besides the Borg-Warner T-5 transmission used in the 82–86 Nissan ZX Turbos. The use of USA-made parts was phased in prior to the passage of local content laws imposed by the U.S. Government.

The Maxima featured a phonograph-based voice warning system. Warnings an open door, etc. would be relayed through the miniaturized phonograph and played audibly: "door is open, key is in ignition, etc." 1981 models were the first 'talking car' marketed in the US and offered only one voice warning, a female voice reminding the driver to "Please turn off the lights".

Second generation (PU11; 1985) 

On October 17, 1984, the first front-wheel drive Maxima (based on the Bluebird U11) was introduced for the 1985 model year. In Japan, a smaller 2.0-liter version of this engine was fitted. These engines were the first V6 engine to be mass-produced in Japan. The second generation was assigned compact status in the US market. This was the last generation to be available as a station wagon, a version which had been offered since the Datsun 810 days.

In late 1986, the 1987 Maxima was introduced with a freshened exterior and interior. Automatic shoulder belts were now found on both the 1987 sedan and wagons built after February 1987. Luxury amenities were offered on both the "base" GL, later renamed GXE and SE trim levels. Such features for the GL/GXE included digital touch entry system on the driver and passenger side door panel, power windows, locks, antenna, power seats, remote trunk release, voice warning system, optional leather seating, optional heated front seats, an optional Electronics Pkg (a sedan exclusive, it included a digital instruments and a trip computer) and an optional power sunroof (sunroof was standard on Maxima wagons). 15-inch alloy wheels were standard for the Maxima.

An exclusive option for 1988 was the Sonar Suspension System -which was part of the Electronics Pkg- replacing the trip computer that was previously offered. This feature used sonar waves to monitor the road conditions ahead and adjusted the shocks accordingly for the most controlled ride. 1988 was also the year that the previously standard digital touch system offered on the GXE sedan became part of the 'Electronics Package' option as well. The SE (and some GXEs) offered dual power seats, a five-speed manual transmission, three-way shock adjustable suspension, front and rear windshield defroster, and a factory-installed security system. The SE also has a small rear spoiler, all-wheel disc brakes, black side rear view mirrors, and body molding (GXE got body-color side rear-view mirrors and matching body molding). Again, the Maxima's prime competitor was the similarly specified Toyota Cressida, which remained rear wheel drive. The Maxima provided a combination of luxury and sporty features while the Cressida was generally seen as being softer and more luxurious.

The Japanese market  received either four-door hardtop sedan or pillared sedan bodywork and a 2.0-liter V6 engine (with an available turbocharger). It received the smaller V6 engine so that it would comply with Japanese Government dimension regulations that tax larger vehicles. The station wagon bodywork was not available in the home market, with the hardtop exclusive to Nissan Bluebird Store Japanese dealerships.

Third generation (J30; 1988) 

The redesigned Maxima debuted on October 24, 1988 for the 1989 model year, internally designated J30. Larger dimensions made it the second Japanese sedan sold in North America to qualify as a "mid-size" (after the Mazda 929). Nissan used a "4DSC" window decal on the third generation Maxima in North America, marketing it as a "four-door sports car." This generation was briefly marketed in Japan, replacing the Nissan Leopard sedan at Nissan Bluebird Store locations. A refresh occurred in August 1991 for the 1992 model year (from July 1991 production), adding a driver's side SRS airbag. The facelifted version was no longer offered in Japan.

In the United States, the VG30E engine, which featured a variable intake manifold on automatic and manual transmission models, was used on all 1989 to 1994 GXE models and 1989 to 1991 SE models. This generation Maxima was fitted with an independent rear suspension, and continued to offer the road scanning, electronic Super Sonic Suspension (sonar). The digital touch entry system on the GXE (in conjunction with the new Luxury Package) allowed the windows to be lowered and the moon roof opened from outside the vehicle on a keypad integrated on the front door handle, without the key in the ignition. One of the industry's first heads up displays was also included in the package, for model years 1989-92. The system projected a holographic image of the vehicles speed on a small screen in the windshield. 

The VE30DE engine was exclusively offered on the 1992–1994 Maxima SE. It was a 3.0-liter, 24 valve, DOHC motor. Its iron block was topped with aluminum cylinder heads and featured a dual length intake manifold (5-speed model only), variable intake valve timing, coil on plug ignition, plus a limited-slip differential. SE models include white-faced gauges, twisted-spoke turbine wheels (.5 inch wider than GXE wheels and similar in design to wheels offered on the Z31 300ZX), body-colored grille, twin-tip mufflers, factory-tinted tail lights, black trim replacing chrome, firmer sport suspension, and optional 5-speed manual transmission. The automatic transmission on all GXEs (RE4F02A) was a compact unit from Jatco, which featured "sport" and "comfort" modes that shifted at different points. The 1992 to 1994 SE received an optional automatic transmission (RE4F04V) that had stronger internals, but kept the "sport" and "comfort" modes. The SE also had a rear spoiler and black side mirrors, whereas the GXE has body-color side mirrors.

During this year, the Maxima was first introduced to the European market, replacing the Laurel. For European markets, the model range was: 3.0, 3.0 S, and 3.0 SE.

Nissan Australia began importing the J30 series for a May 1990 release to replace the locally assembled Nissan Skyline (R31) sedan and station wagon. Nissan made the Maxima available in two equipment grades, the M and Ti. The M featured air conditioning, alloy wheels, central locking, cruise control, power steering, and power windows. The Ti added a rear spoiler, climate control air conditioning, anti-lock brakes, electric seats and a PIN touch-pad locking system. The M-based LE of late 1991 featured a CD player and sunroof. There was also a leather/sunroof pack optional on Ti. Nissan Australia released a facelift in January 1993 that included a new grille insert, revised tail lamps, wheels and cabin trim. A driver airbag was now fitted to the Ti, and made optional on the new Executive trim that replaced the M. The J30 in Australia was replaced in February 1995 by a new Maxima based on the Nissan Cefiro (A32).

The three variants assembled locally in New Zealand had automatic transmissions and the VG30E Engine only. Versions sold in Japan and Europe had a manual transmission option as an alternative to the automatic transmission that was standard in North America and Australia/New Zealand. The Maxima SE was on Car and Driver magazine's Ten Best list for 1990.

Another Bluebird Maxima continued on as a Nissan Bluebird (U12) and solely as a station wagon with the VG20ET engine during this period until the introduction of the U13 Bluebird, and the Avenir replaced the Bluebird wagon altogether.

Fourth generation (A32; 1994) 

Designed from early 1990 to March 1991, the fourth generation Maxima arrived in May 1994 for the 1995 model year as the A32. A new VQ30DE 190 hp (141 kW),  3.0 liter V6 was the only engine option for the North American market. The VQ30DE earned a first spot on the Ward's 10 Best Engines List, and the VQ has now been recognized consecutively for every year since its introduction (as of 2012, 18 years running). The independent rear suspension of the previous generation was replaced with a lighter and cheaper torsion bar solid axle system, part of a general trend of cost cutting by Japanese manufacturers in the wake of the bursting of Japan's economic bubble of the late 1980s.

The Maxima's primary competitor, the Toyota Cressida, was discontinued after the 1992 model year, with Toyota touting the front-wheel-drive Toyota Avalon, a stretched version of the Toyota Camry introduced in 1994, as its replacement.

The North American 1995 Maxima included a Bose Sound System on the GLE (optional on the SE) which had a 6 speaker sound system, a Clarion system was also an option (non-Bose). The fourth generation Maxima was highly praised for its quiet, roomy interior. This Maxima was Motor Trends Import Car of the Year for 1995. The Maxima SE again made Car and Driver magazine's Ten Best list for 1995 and 1996. 

With the manual transmission 0–60 mph took 6.6 seconds with a quarter-mile time of 15.2-seconds at 92.4-mph, making it both the quickest and fastest (142 mph top speed) Japanese sedan on the North American market at that time. A top-of-the-line 1994 Maxima GLE equipped with a four-speed automatic transmission turned in a 6.7 second 0-60-mph run with a 15.6-second/89.4-mph quarter-mile time.

At the time, the Maxima was one of few four-door, six-cylinder cars sold in North America with a standard manual transmission. A viscous limited slip differential came standard on Canadian SE models equipped with the 5-speed manual (in the US, the VLSD was restricted to the Infiniti I30). The automatic was a no cost option, which most Maximas were equipped with.

In October 1996, the Maxima's exterior was refreshed for 1997, with new five-spoke alloy wheels, plastic (clear-lens) headlights vs. the previous glass headlights, a slightly different front and rear fascia with new redesigned tail-lights, the rear-facing part of the trunk was smoothed out to match the tail-lights, redesigned fog-lights and badge designs, and a chrome grille insert for GLE's (body color for SE models) was added. Among interior changes were a different steering wheel and CD player. Front seat-mounted side impact airbags were added as an option for 1998 and 1999 SE and GLE models. There were also structural modifications to improve crash worthiness for the 1997 to 1999 models. The 1999 Nissan Maxima also saw some minor changes: an Anti-Theft Engine Immobilizer was standard using a chip in the ignition key, as well as some minor body trims. The 1999 Maxima SE was also available with a Limited Package which consisted of Titanium tinted SE-Limited emblems on the front doors, titanium tinted trunk emblems, and titanium tinted 16" alloy wheels. The interior gauge cluster was also titanium tinted and the optional leather seats were perforated and embossed with SE on the backrests. The front floor mats were also embossed with SE-Limited logos.

As the Maxima badge was retired in Japan, this particular generation was sold there as the Nissan Cefiro A32. The Cefiro badge had previously been used on a Nissan Laurel-based, higher specification model with rear-wheel drive (see A31 Cefiro). For the Japanese market, a Cefiro-badged station wagon was also available. One version of the Cefiro (Brougham VIP spec) was sold in the US as the Infiniti I30, yet the Cefiro had subtle differences including different fog light arrangements, one-piece headlights and a few assorted engine options (VQ20/25/30DE). The Cefiro was actually introduced first, in August 1994, and was originally available with 2 and 2.5-liter V6 engines with  JIS.

This generation was also sold as the Maxima QX in Europe and other parts of the world, and was mostly identical to the Japanese Cefiro except for minor trim differences.

Fifth generation (A33B; 2000) 

Introduced in May 1999, the MY 2000 Maxima was designed at Nissan's La Jolla, California design studio 1996–1997 under the direction of Jerry Hirshberg, and was internally designated A33B.  The fifth generation Maxima was a badge engineered variant of the JDM A33 Nissan Cefiro, which was itself marketed globally, including by Nissan North America's luxury Infiniti brand as the I30 and subsequently as the I35. The A33 Cefiro was marketed in Europe as the Maxima QX.

The engine was a  3.0 L VQ30DE V6 for all versions except the SE, which produced . The vehicle has a 0–60 mph time of 7.0 seconds. This variant of the VQ30DE was referred to as the VQ30DE-K. The A33b was offered in GXE (base), GLE (luxury, with 16 inch alloy wheels) and SE trim levels, the latter offering a rear trunklid spoiler.

For the 2001 model year, Nissan offered an SE model trim package commemorating the model's 20th anniversary. In addition to SE content, the commemorative edition used the Infiniti I30 engine, ground effect rocker panels, drilled metal "brushed metallic" pedals, brushed metallic shifter, and stainless steel door embossed sill plates. The optional leather interior was perforated, unlike that in the regular SE. Finally, the "SE Comfort and Convenience Package" included a sunroof and 17" dark chrome alloy wheels.

For the 2002 model year, the Maxima received a mild facelift. The facelifted version received a larger, revised grille and front bumper openings, revised foglamps with vertical lines in the glass lens, larger Nissan emblem on the grille, a revised headlamp design with high-intensity discharge (HID) low beams, a six-speed manual transmission with optional helical Torsen limited-slip differential borrowed from the Japan market Nissan Skyline GT-R (identified by brushed, metal pedals for the accelerator, brake, and clutch), revised 17-inch 6-spoke alloy wheels in silver on the SE model, new 17-inch 7-spoke machined alloy wheels on the GLE model, clear Altezza-style taillights, a revised rocker moulding/side skirt standard on all models, and interior and refinements over the 2000 to 2001 models.

Some interior differences include slightly redesigned seats, a smaller screw-on shift knob on automatic models along with a different shift pattern, a redesigned steering wheel, revised headunits, and a different cup holder lid. Facelift SE models equipped with the six-speed manual transmissions were capable of 0-60 acceleration of 6.0 seconds with a 1/4 mile time of 14.7 seconds at 97 mph. The 2002-2003 models also posted better braking numbers, requiring 182 feet to stop from 70 mph, compared with the 195 feet of the earlier model.

For 2003, Nissan offered an option to SE trim, marketed as the "Titanium Edition," which included glossy titanium color 6-spoke alloy wheels and titanium interior accents. In the United States, the Meridian Edition option included heated front seats, steering wheel and outside mirrors; the Leather Package included leather-appointed seats, 4-way power passenger’s seat and power driver’s seat with memory function and entry/exit feature (SE A/T, std. GLE).  Other options included Power Glass Sliding Sunroof with tilt (SE, GLE); front seat side- impact supplemental air bags (SE, GLE); traction control system (SE automatic, GLE); helical limited-slip differential (SE manual); Bose? audio system (SE, std. GLE) and Nissan Navigation System (SE, GLE). In Russia and Europe, the Maxima was marketed as Nissan Maxima QX.

Sixth generation (A34; 2004) 

The sixth generation Maxima, code-named A34, was marketed soley in the United States, Canada and Mexico. It was developed from 1998 to 2002, with a March 2001 design freeze. It was introduced in production form as a 2004 model at the 2003 North American International Auto Show. Sixth generation Maximas were available in two trim levels, SE and SL. The sporty SE model came standard with 18 inch alloy wheels, P245/45R18 V-rated tires, stiffer suspension, rear spoiler, and an optional 6-speed manual transmission. The luxurious SL model came standard with 17 inch alloy wheels, P225/55R17 H-rated tires, wood interior trim, 6-disc CD changer, Bose stereo, leather seats, and HID headlights and optional heated front seats. The manual transmission was never offered in the SL model and the suspension is tuned for a softer ride. For all models, the rear independent suspension returned, this time using a multilink setup similar to the Altima.

For 2007, the U.S. Maxima became available with a standard Xtronic CVT (Continuously Variable Transmission) (similar to the CVT found in the Nissan Murano) as the only transmission choice; a manual transmission was no longer offered; however the CVT featured a manual mode. It featured a freshened front fascia (lacking the center block, the new grille closely resembled that of the 2007 Altima). Headlights were also more squared around the edges. New interior changes included an Intelligent Key system with integrated ignition tab, new center console, and new white-and-orange gauges as opposed to the older pure orange ones.

For 2008, the Maxima's fuel economy dropped from 21MPG-City / 28MPG-Highway to 19/25 due to new EPA measurement methods. A Platinum Edition package of convenience features was added for 2008 on both SE and SL trim levels.

In Australia, the Maxima had the same engine, but Nissan set the maximum power to only . The Australian version was code-named J31, shared the VQ engine, initially only came with a four-speed automatic transmission, and had quite noticeable styling differences to the North American version as it was based on the Nissan Teana. In 2007, it received a minor mid-life facelift and an all-new CVT automatic transmission.

The North American Maxima was known for a balance between sport and luxury; other models tended to focus more on comfort.

Seventh generation (A35; 2009) 

The Maxima was redesigned for the 2009 model year and made its debut at the 2008 New York International Auto Show. The seventh generation Maxima (A35) is built on the Nissan D platform sharing this platform with the fourth generation Nissan Altima and second generation Nissan Murano. The exterior and interior design are somewhat similar to the Infiniti G and Infiniti M, with an updated navigation interface and optional USB interface system that works with the main console monitor and steering wheel controls. It serves as Nissan's North American top front wheel drive sedan at Nissan dealerships.

A revised version of Nissan's Xtronic CVT (continuously variable transmission) with paddle shifting was the only transmission offered, with no manual or regular automatic available. A diesel version was expected to be released for the 2010 model year, although those plans were not realized. The new Maxima was offered in S and SV trims with several premium and technology packages available. The Maxima's design traded height and length for a sleeker styling, although the width was increased slightly. The keyless ignition uses a push button to start and stop the engine. In the U.S., the seventh generation Maxima went on sale in late June 2008. The SkyView center glass was replaced by a retractable panoramic moonroof for A35 series Maxima.

Performance:
 0–60 mph: 5.8 sec.
 Skid Pad Lateral acceleration: 0.85 g
 1/4 Mile: 14.5 sec. at 
 60–0 mph:

Model year changes 

2012
For 2012, Nissan modestly freshened the Maxima's exterior, with a new grille, taillights and new alloy wheels in 18- and 19-inch diameters. Three new exterior colors, Java Metallic, Dark Slate, and Pearl White are available.

The cabin received a few small trim changes, but was mostly carried over from 2011.
A new $710 Limited Edition package on the Maxima 3.5 S bundled smoked xenon headlights, a compass in the rearview mirror, 18-inch dark-silver-finish alloy wheels, rear spoiler, dark satin chrome grille, foglights, outside mirrors with integrated turn signals and metallic trim.

2013
The 2013 Nissan Maxima still remained the same for the most part and was available with three new option packages for the new model year. There is the Bose Audio Package, a Bose audio upgrade with SiriusXM Satellite Radio functionality. The "SV Value Package" includes the premium Bose audio setup along with heated front seats, a heated steering wheel and heated outside mirrors. The Sport Package included alloy wheels and a climate-controlled driver's seat, combined with the Maxima Monitor Package (a rearview camera system, seven-inch color monitor, USB port and an iPod storage net).

2014
Nissan's flagship Maxima sedan entered the 2014 model year in late August 2013 with the addition of a new S Value Package. This has smoked appearance HID Xenon headlights, a compass in the rearview mirror, rear spoiler, fog lights, outside mirrors with integrated turn signals and metallic trim treatment. The Monitor and HID Xenon Packages were no longer available, while the SV received most of the Monitor package as standard. There were two new exterior colors: Gun Metallic (replaces Dark Gray) and Midnight Garnet (replaces Tuscan Sun); for eight available exterior colors total. The 3.5 S and 3.5 SV were the available models, each powered by a  3.5-liter V6 engine mated to an Xtronic CVT. 2014 was the last year for this generation Nissan Maxima, despite it carrying over into 2015 as a 2014 model year. Nissan  stated "they will have plenty 2014 Nissan Maximas on dealer lots until the all-new 2016 Nissan Maxima arrives" in calendar year 2015.

Eighth generation (A36; 2016) 

The eighth-generation Maxima was unveiled at the April 2015 New York International Auto Show. Sporting an athletic body redesign, Nissan calls it a "four-door sports car", a marketing term also used on the third generation J30 series (1988-1992). The Nissan Sport Sedan Concept shown in the 2014 Detroit Auto Show previewed the exterior design of the vehicle. The vehicle is 82 pounds lighter than before, with a revamped interior taking inspiration from aerospace. The Maxima is available with six exterior color options and three trim levels: SV, SR, and Platinum. There was also an SR Midnight Edition that was introduced in 2016. The Midnight Edition blacked out most chrome (Grille, rims, rear chrome, exhaust tips, etc.) and added a more sporty appearance to the Maxima. The Midnight Edition was discontinued after the 2018 model year. For the 2021 model year a 40th Anniversary edition is available with unique Ruby Slate Grey Pearl paint, black exterior & interior trim, black wheels, 40th Anniversary floor mats & exterior badge and a unique white face gauge cluster.

This generation Maxima made its debut in China at the 2015 Guangzhou Auto Show with the Chinese name 西玛, which they used as the previous generation Nissan Cima.

An updated Maxima was revealed at the 2018 LA Auto Show and released later that year.

The Maxima for Mexico was facelifted on July 9, 2019. It is offered in the Advance, SR, and Exclusive trim lines.

The Nissan Maxima was discontinued from the Mexican market after the 2020 model year.  For the US and Canada, Nissan plans to end production of the Maxima in 2023. However, the Maxima name could be used on an upcoming electric sedan which will get an Infiniti equivalent.

Performance:

 : 5.9 sec.
 Skid Pad Lateral acceleration: 0.87 g
 1/4 Mile: 14.4 sec. at 
 :

Sales

Other versions 

In other markets, the Maxima J30 series sold internationally between 1990 and 1994, albeit with different frontal styling to the North American version. Between 1994 and 2003, the "Maxima" name was applied to the Nissan Cefiro sold in Australasia, Europe, and South America. From 2003 until 2013, Nissan in Australasia also retailed the Teana under the Maxima badge.

In the Philippines, the T12 Nissan Auster was sold as the Maxima.

In the United Kingdom, the "Maxima" name was also used in the mid 1980s as a high series trim designation on the B11 Sunny, N12 Cherry and the Japanese built versions of the T12 Bluebird/Stanza.

References

External links 

 

Maxima
Cars introduced in 1981
1990s cars
2000s cars
2010s cars
2020s cars
Rear-wheel-drive vehicles
Front-wheel-drive vehicles
Mid-size cars
Sedans
Station wagons
Vehicles with CVT transmission
Motor vehicles manufactured in the United States